Jarava is a genus in the subfamily Pooideae of the grass family Poaceae.

Species

 Jarava academica
 Jarava ambigua
 Jarava ameghinoi
 Jarava annua
 Jarava arenicola
 Jarava arundinacea
 Jarava atacamensis
 Jarava barrancaensis
 Jarava bertrandii
 Jarava brachychaeta
 Jarava braun-blanquetii
 Jarava brevipes
 Jarava breviseta
 Jarava castellanosii
 Jarava caudata
 Jarava chrysophylla
 Jarava chubutensis
 Jarava durifolia
 Jarava eriostachya
 Jarava frigida
 Jarava hieronymusii
 Jarava humilis
 Jarava hypsophila
 Jarava hystricina
 Jarava ibarii
 Jarava ichia
 Jarava ichu
 Jarava illimanica
 Jarava juncoides
 Jarava leptostachya
 Jarava macbridei
 Jarava maeviae
 Jarava malalhuensis
 Jarava mattheii
 Jarava media
 Jarava megapotamica
 Jarava milleana
 Jarava nana
 Jarava neaei
 Jarava nicorae
 Jarava pachypus
 Jarava parodiana
 Jarava patagonica
 Jarava plumosa
 Jarava plumosula
 Jarava pogonathera
 Jarava polyclada
 Jarava pseudoichu
 Jarava psylantha
 Jarava pugionata
 Jarava pungens
 Jarava ruiz-lealii
 Jarava scabrifolia
 Jarava scirpea
 Jarava semperiana
 Jarava sorianoi
 Jarava speciosa
 Jarava subaristata
 Jarava subnitida
 Jarava subplumosa
 Jarava tortuosa
 Jarava usitata
 Jarava vaginata
 Jarava vatroensis

References

External links

Pooideae